Rajon ki Baoli also referred as Rajon ki Bain is a famous stepwell in Mehrauli Archaeological Park of Delhi, India.

It was commissioned by Daulat Khan in 1506 CE, an administrator of the Lodi dynasty of the Delhi Sultanate.

The enclosure of Rajon Ki Baoli also includes a mosque and a tomb.

The name Rajon Ki Baoli is derived from the 'Rajbirs' or 'Mistris' - the term used for masons. It got its name in early 20th century because of the masons that moved in permanently into the area.

From the North, the steps lead down to the water filled in the stepwell and, from the east and west sides the stepwell is enclosed by high walls. The walls have a narrow side to walk on and twelve pillars both sides that encased arched niches.

Architecture 
The monument gives its first impression of the medieval period. A courtyard surrounded by a verandah with many beautiful pillars and the arches in the verandah are made in the typical north Indian fashion of that time. There is a stepwell at the center of the structure the steps leading to the stepwell are made in such a way that it gets cooler as reaches down near the stepwell.

Location 
The Rajon Ki Baoli is located in the Mehrauli Archaeological Park, Jamali Kamali in the Mehrauli area of South Delhi. The site is located near the Adham Khan's Tomb and Gandhak Ki Baoli.

Gallery

See also 

 Jamali Kamali Mosque and Tomb, located in the Archaeological Village complex in Mehrauli, Delhi, India.
The Tomb of Ghiyas ud din Balban is located in Mehrauli, New Delhi, India.
Adham Khan's Tomb (Hindi: आधम खान का मकबरा, Urdu: ادھم خان کا مزار‎, Bangla: আধম খানের সমাধি) is the 16th-century tomb of Adham Khan, a general of the Mughal Emperor Akbar.

References

External links

Infrastructure completed in 1516
Mehrauli
Monuments of National Importance in Delhi
Stepwells in Delhi
1516 establishments in Asia